NHL Network may refer to:

 NHL Network (American TV channel)
 NHL Network (Canadian TV channel)
 The NHL Network (1975–79)

See also
 National Hockey League on television